The Mohun Bagan Athletic Club is an Indian professional multi-sport club based in Kolkata, West Bengal. The cricket division of the club participates in various tournaments of varying age groups conducted by the Cricket Association of Bengal. The date of foundation of the club is debatable but there have been mentions of the club having a cricket team from as far back as 1922.

Currently the team participates in the CAB First Division League, CAB Senior Knockout, CAB Super League, Bengal T20 League and JC Mukherjee Trophy. The team plays its home matches mostly at the Eden Gardens. They have won over 100 major state-level trophies so far. In past many big names like Sourav Ganguly, Sachin Tendulkar, Virat Kohli, MS Dhoni and even Sri Lankan player Chaminda Vaas had played for the club.

Current squad

Player(s) with international caps are listed in bold.

Honours
CAB First Division League (27): 1953–54, 1959–60, 1960 – 61, 1962–63, 1963–64, 1964–65, 1965–66, 1966–67, 1968–69, 1970–71, 1974–75, 1975–76, 1976–77, 1979–80, 1981–82, 1982–83, 1984–85, 1985–86, 1986–87, 1987–88, 1988–89, 1993–94, 1995–96, 1997–98, 1999–00, 2002–03, 2017-18
CAB Super League (2): 2015–16, 2017–18
CAB Senior Knockout (32): 1952–53, 1953–54, 1954–55, 1955–56, 1957–58, 1958–59, 1960–61, 1963–64, 1964–65, 1968–69, 1969–1970, 1973–74, 1975–76, 1976–77, 1978–79, 1981–82, 1983–84, 1984–1985, 1986–87, 1988–89, 1989–90, 1993–94, 1994–95, 1995–96, 1998–99, 1999–00, 2001–02, 2011–12, 2012–13, 2015–16, 2016–17, 2018–19
P. Sen Trophy (19): 1972–73, 1976–77, 1979–80, 1981–82, 1982–83, 1983–84, 1984–85, 1986–87, 1987–88, 1988–89, 1989–90, 1990–91, 1992–93, 1994–95, 1995–96, 1998–99, 2000–01, 2008–09, 2011–12
J. C. Mukherjee Trophy (23): 1982–83, 1984–85, 1985–86, 1988–89, 1989–90, 1990–91, 1991–92, 1992–93, 1994–95, 1995–96, 1996–1997, 1999–00, 2000–01, 2001–02, 2002–03, 2008–09, 2010–11, 2011–12, 2012–13, 2013–14, 2015–16, 2017–18, 2018-19
A. N. Ghosh Trophy (8): 1993–94, 1994–95, 1999–00, 2001–02, 2002–03, 2009–2010, 2010–11, 2011–12

References

Mohun Bagan AC
Cricket in West Bengal
Sports clubs in Kolkata